The 2022 Bugaya by-election was a by-election held on 19 November 2022 for the Sabah State Legislative Assembly seat of Bugaya. It was called following the death of the incumbent, Manis Muka Mohd Darah on 17 November 2020. Manis Muka was a 2-term state assemblywoman first elected at the 2018 Sabah state election. She was a member of the Sabah Heritage Party (WARISAN).

The by-election was to be held within 60 days after the seat was declared vacant, however due to the COVID-19 pandemic in Sabah, then Prime Minister Muhyiddin Yassin advised the Yang di-Pertuan Agong to declare an emergency to postpone the by-election. The emergency proclamation was eventually revoked on 7 October 2022. The by-election was held concurrently with the 2022 Malaysian general election and the 2022 Malaysian state elections for the state assemblies of Pahang, Perak and Perlis.

Nominations

Results

Previous results

References

2022 elections in Malaysia
By-elections in Malaysia
December 2022 events in Malaysia
Elections in Sabah